Papyrocranus is a genus of freshwater fishes in family Notopteridae found in Middle and West Africa.

Species
 Papyrocranus afer (Günther, 1868) (reticulated knifefish)
 Papyrocranus congoensis (Nichols & La Monte, 1932)

References 

 

Notopteridae
Freshwater fish genera